Larry 'L.C.' Joyner (July 2, 1933 – February 10, 2006) was a professional American football Halfback in the National Football League (NFL) and Cornerback in the American Football League (AFL). He was drafted by the NFL's San Francisco 49ers in 1956 and played for the AFL's Oakland Raiders during their inaugural season.

References 

1933 births
2006 deaths
People from Pittsburg, California
People from Canton, Mississippi
Players of American football from California
American football cornerbacks
Oakland Raiders players
San Francisco 49ers players
Sportspeople from the San Francisco Bay Area
American Football League players